Kosmos 1456 ( meaning Cosmos 1456) was a Soviet US-K missile early warning satellite which was launched in 1983 as part of the Soviet military's Oko programme. The satellite was designed to identify missile launches using optical telescopes and infrared sensors.

Kosmos 1456 was launched from Site 16/2 at Plesetsk Cosmodrome in the Russian SSR. A Molniya-M carrier rocket with a 2BL upper stage was used to perform the launch, which took place at 19:34 UTC on 25 April 1983. The launch successfully placed the satellite into a molniya orbit. It subsequently received its Kosmos designation, and the international designator 1983-038A. The United States Space Command assigned it the Satellite Catalog Number 14034.

It self-destructed  and then re-entered the Earth's atmosphere on 11 May 1998.

See also

 1983 in spaceflight
 List of Kosmos satellites (1251–1500)
 List of Oko satellites
 List of R-7 launches (1980-1984)

References

Kosmos satellites
Oko
1983 in spaceflight
Spacecraft launched in 1983
Spacecraft launched by Molniya-M rockets
Spacecraft which reentered in 1998